Vít Nemrava (born 9 January 1996 in the Czech Republic) is a Czech footballer.

Career

Nemrava started his career with Slovácko in the Czech top flight.

At the age of 17, he was sent on loan to English Premier League side West Ham United.

In 2017, he was sent on loan to MFK Vítkovice in the Czech second division.

For the second half of 2017/18, Nemrava was sent on loan to Czech third division club ČSK Uherský Brod, before returning to Slovácko.

References

External links
 Vít Nemrava at Soccerway

Association football goalkeepers
Living people
Czech footballers
1996 births
MFK Vítkovice players
1. FC Slovácko players